Calvin Saleem Muhammad (born Calvin Vincent Raley; December 10, 1958 – January 4, 2023) was an American football wide receiver in the National Football League for the Los Angeles Raiders, Washington Redskins, and San Diego Chargers. He played college football at Texas Southern University and was drafted as the 17th pick in the 12th round of the 1980 NFL Draft. Muhammad converted to Islam while in college. Muhammad had three daughters; Khaleelah, Bekkah and Jean, and two sons, Ibin and Vincent. He died on January 4, 2023, at the age of 64.

References

1958 births
2023 deaths
African-American Muslims
American football wide receivers
American Muslims
Players of American football from Jacksonville, Florida
Texas Southern Tigers football players
Los Angeles Raiders players
Washington Redskins players
San Diego Chargers players
National Football League replacement players